Michael Kießling (born 29 May 1973) is a German engineer and politician of the Christian Social Union (CSU) who has been serving as a member of the Bundestag from the state of Bavaria since 2017.

Political career 
Kießling became a member of the Bundestag in the 2017 German federal election, representing the Starnberg and Landsberg districts. 

In parliament, Kießling serves on the Committee on Construction, Housing, Urban Development and Communities and the Committee on the Environment, Nature Conservation and Nuclear Safety. In this capacity, he is his parliamentary group's rapporteur on the conversion of facilities no longer used by the Bundeswehr.

Other activities
 Nuclear Waste Disposal Fund (KENFO), Alternate Member of the Board of Trustees (since 2022)
 Augsburg University of Applied Sciences, Member of the Board of Trustees

References

External links 

  
 Bundestag biography 

1973 births
Living people
Members of the Bundestag for Bavaria
Members of the Bundestag 2021–2025
Members of the Bundestag 2017–2021
People from Hinwil District
Members of the Bundestag for the Christian Social Union in Bavaria